Conflict is an English anarcho-punk band originally based in Eltham in South London. Formed in 1981, the band's original line up consisted of: Colin Jerwood (vocals), Francisco 'Paco' Carreno (drums), John  (bass guitar), Steve (guitars), Pauline (vocals), Paul a.k.a. 'Nihilistic Nobody' (visuals). Their first release was the EP "The House That Man Built" on Crass Records. By the time they released their first album, It's Time to See Who's Who, on Corpus Christi Records, Pauline and Paul had left the band. Conflict later set up its own Mortarhate Records label, which put out releases by other artists including Hagar the Womb, Icons of Filth, Lost Cherrees, The Apostles, and Stalag 17.

In 1983, Steve Ignorant, who was at the time a member of the band Crass, guested on the band's pro-animal rights single "To A Nation of Animal Lovers". After the dissolution of Crass, Ignorant later became second vocalist for Conflict on a semi-permanent basis. This followed a 1986 gig in Brixton, London, when he had joined the band on stage for a few numbers.

The band has always been outspoken regarding issues such as anarchism, animal rights, the anti-war movement and in their support for the organisation Class War, and a number of their gigs during the 1980s were followed by riots and disturbances.

Former band drummer, Francisco "Paco" Carreno, died on 20 February 2015, at the age of 49.

Members

Original line up
Colin Jerwood (vocals)
John  (bass guitar)
Kenny Barnes (drums)
Graham Ball (guitar)
Paul Fryday, a.k.a. 'Nihilistic Nobody' (visuals)

Later members
Francisco "Paco" Carreno (drums)
 Steve Gittins (guitar)
Mandy Spokes (vocals)
Kevin Webb (guitar)
Paul Hoddy (bass guitar)
Chris Parish (guitar)
Kerry B (vocals)
Steve Ignorant (vocals)
Ferenc Collins (guitar)
Marshall Penn (guitar)
Derek Reid (bass)
Mark Pickstone (keyboards)
Jackie Hanna (vocals)
Sarah Taylor (vocals)
Spike Smith (drums)
Eve Scragg (vocals)
Matthew Zilch (guitar)
Gav King (guitar)
William Faith (guitar)
Jeannie Ford (vocals)

Current members
 Colin Jerwood (Vocals)
 Stuart Meadows (Drums)
 Gav King (Guitar)
 Fiona Friel (Vocals)
 Fran Fearon (Bass Guitar)

Discography
Chart placings shown are from the UK Indie Chart.

Studio albums
 It's Time to See Who's Who LP (March 1983, Corpus Christi Records) (#1)
reissued in May 1994 as It's Time to See Who's Who Now by Mortarhate Records, with a different track listing.
 Increase the Pressure LP / CD (June 1984, Mortarhate Records) (#2)
 The Ungovernable Force LP (August 1986, Mortarhate Records) (#2)
reissued in 2006 with bonus tracks on CD by Mortarhate Records.
 From Protest To Resistance LP (1986, Bust Fund) (#11)
 The Final Conflict LP (December 1988, Mortarhate Records) (#13)
 Against All Odds LP (1989, Mortarhate Records)
 Conclusion LP / CD (December 1993, Mortarhate Records)
 There's No Power Without Control LP / CD (July 2003, Mortarhate Records)

EPs
 "The House That Man Built" EP (June 1982, Crass Records) (#3). Later re-issued on Mortarhate Records.
 "To a Nation of Animal Lovers" EP (October 1983, Corpus Christi Records) (#4). Later re-issued on Mortarhate Records.
 "The Serenade is Dead" EP (January 1984, Mortarhate Records) (#5)
 "This is Not Enough, Stand Up and Fucking Fight" 7" (March 1985, Mortarhate Records) (#3)
 "The Battle Continues" 7" (October 1985, Mortarhate Records) (#1)
 "The Final Conflict" 12"(1988, Mortarhate Records)
 "These Colours Don't Run" 7" / CD (October 1993, Mortarhate Records)
 "BBC1" 7" (1995, Mortarhate Records)
 "Now You've Put Your Foot in It" 7" / CD (2001, Mortarhate Records)
 "Carlo Giuliani" 7" / CD (April 2003, Mortarhate Records)

Compilations
Who? What? Why? When? Where? LP / CD (1984, Mortarhate Records).  The album had little circulation on its initial release, but gained greater currency when re-released in 2003.
 Employing All Means Necessary LP / CD (1985, Mortarhate Records)
 Standard Issue 82–87 LP / CD (February 1989, Mortarhate Records)
 Standard Issue II 88–94 LP / CD (1996, Mortarhate Records)
 Deploying All Means Necessary (February 1997)
 There Must Be Another Way (January 2001)

Live
 Live at Centro Iberico EP (October 1982, Xntrix Records) (#7). Later re-issued on Mortarhate Records.
 Live at Brest, France (March 1983)
 Only Stupid Bastards Help EMI LP (1986, New Army Records) (#5)
 Leeds University  (April 1986)
 Turning Rebellion into Money Double LP / CD (1987, Mortarhate Records) (#1)
 In The Venue (April 2000)
 In America CD (2001, Go-Kart Records 83)
 Live in London (2004)

Other
 Rebellion Sucks! (Anthology and DVD of live in London 2004)

See also
Animal rights and punk subculture

References

External links

 

Anarcho-punk groups
English punk rock groups
Musical groups from the Royal Borough of Greenwich
Musical groups established in 1981
People from Eltham